Frederick University is a private university in the Republic of Cyprus. It offers undergraduate and graduate programs on two campuses, one in the capital of the island Nicosia and the other in the second largest city, Limassol.

Frederick University offers teaching and research in the fields of science, technology, letters and the arts.

History
Although Frederick University was formally established as a university in 2007, it has a long history in higher education. The organization was first established in 1965 as the Nicosia Technical and Economics School and has since 1975 offered higher education programs as Frederick Institute of Technology (FIT). It offered a broad range of diploma, degree and master courses in the areas of science, engineering, business, tourism, arts, media and education. As a college of higher education, it had established collaborations with a number of UK universities (Bristol, Sunderland University) to jointly offer two-year diploma and Master programs.

With the Cyprus law for private universities coming into effect, FIT applied to establish Frederick University, becoming one of the first private universities in Cyprus in September 2007.
Frederick University is in the top 100 management and technical universities in Europe and is ranked 5th in Cyprus.

Schools and programs 

The university operates five schools and more than 80 programs. It also operates a number of technical programs under the Frederick Institute of Technology (FIT).

Undergraduate programs

 School of Arts, Communication and Cultural Studies 
 BA in Visual Communication 
 BA in Interior Design
 BA in Fashion and Image Design 
 BA in Journalism

 School of Business and Law
 BA in Business Administration 
 BSc in Accounting and Finance 
 BSc in Maritime Studies 
 Bachelor of Laws (LLB)

 School of Education and Social Sciences
 BEd in Primary Education 
 BEd in Pre-Primary Education 
 BSc in Physical Education and Sport Sciences 
 BSc in Psychology 
 BA in Social Work

 School of Engineering
 Diploma in Architectural Engineering (Integrated Master) 
 BSc in Civil Engineering 
 BSc in Electrical Engineering 
 BSc in Computer Science 
 BSc in Computer Engineering 
 BSc in Mechanical Engineering 
 BSc in Automotive Engineering

 School of Health Sciences
 BSc in Pharmacy 
 BSc in General Nursing

Postgraduate and doctoral programs

 School of Arts, Communication and Cultural Studies 
 MA in Visual Arts
 PhD in Art and Design Practices

 School of Business and Law
 Master of Business Administration (MBA)
 Master of Business Administration (MBA) with specialization in Public Policy and Management
 MSc in International Trade and Shipping Management
 MSc in Marine Engineering and Management
 MSc in Health Management
 MA / LLM  in Maritime Law and Shipping Management
 LLM in Public Law
 PhD in Law
 PhD in Management

 School of Education and Social Sciences
 MA in Adult Education 
 MA in Special Education 
 MA in Educational Administration and Leadership
 MA in Social Work and Social Administration
 MEd in Educational Studies: Curriculum Development and Instruction
 MSc in Education for Sustainable Development and Social Change
 PhD in Education
 PhD in Social Work, Social Policy and Administration

 School of Engineering
 MSc in Conservation and Restoration of Historical Structures and Monuments
 MSc in Electrical Engineering 
 MSc in Manufacturing Engineering Design 
 MSc in Energy Engineering
 MSc in Structural Engineering 
 MSc in Web and Smart Systems
 PhD in Electrical Engineering
 PhD in Mechanical Engineering
 PhD in Civil Engineering
 PhD in Computer Science
 PhD in Computer Engineering

 School of Health Sciences
 MSc in Community Healthcare
 MSc in Health Management
 PhD in Health Management

References

External links 
Frederick University homepage
Frederick Institute of Technology homepage

Educational institutions established in 1965
Universities and colleges in Cyprus
1965 establishments in Cyprus